Calocladia is a genus of fungi in the family Erysiphaceae.

References

External links 

 

Erysiphales
Leotiomycetes genera
Taxa named by Joseph-Henri Léveillé
Taxa described in 1851